The Surrey Smashers are a professional badminton team playing in the National Badminton League. They play their home games at the Surrey Sports Park in Guildford, Surrey, England. They are captained by triple Commonwealth Games medalist Chris Langridge and play in all black.

The Surrey Smashers made a hugely convincing start in their first ever National Badminton League appearance beating the MK Badminton 4–1 in front of the Sky Sports cameras at the Centre MK on 6 October 2014.

References

External links
Official Surrey Smashers website
Official NBL website

Badminton in England
Sport in Guildford